Paku Alam VII was Duke (Adipati)  of Pakualaman, acceding to the throne in 1903, and died in 1937.

Pakualaman (also written Paku Alaman) became a small hereditary Duchy within the Sultanate of Yogyakarta, as a mirror-image of Mangkunegaran in the territory of the Susuhunanate of Surakarta.

On the 25th anniversary of his rule in 1931, six years before his death, he was celebrated with special events and a book 

The Pakualaman dates from 1812 and is an enclave within the Yogyakarta Sultanate. He was succeeded by his son.

Family history

Notes

1882 births
1937 deaths
Dukes of Pakualaman
Pakualaman
Burials at Girigondo
Indonesian royalty
People of the Dutch East Indies